Cortês is a city  in the state of Pernambuco, Brazil.  It is 149 km away from the state capital Recife, and has an estimated (IBGE 2020) population of 12,560 inhabitants.

Geography
 State - Pernambuco
 Region - Zona da mata Pernambucana
 Boundaries - Gravatá   (N);  Joaquim Nabuco    (S);  Amaraji and Ribeirão   (E);  Bonito and Barra de Guabiraba   (W)
 Area - 101.33 km2
 Elevation - 302 m
 Hydrography - Sirinhaém River
 Vegetation - Subperenifólia forest
 Climate - Hot tropical and humid
 Annual average temperature - 23.5 c
 Distance to Recife - 149 km

Economy
The main economic activities in Cortês are largely dominated by the food & beverage industry and agribusiness, especially sugarcane, bananas and cattle.

Economic indicators

Economy by Sector
2006

Health indicators

References

Municipalities in Pernambuco